Colin (1905 – 1932) was an undefeated champion American Thoroughbred racehorse who won all his 15 races including the 1908 Belmont Stakes and was the 1907 and 1908 Horse of the Year as well as the 1907 Champion Two-Year-Old Male and 1908 Champion 3-Year-Old Male and was inducted into the National Museum of Racing and Hall of Fame.

In 1907, he swept the major two-year-old stakes races including the Belmont Futurity and Champagne Stakes and was the consensus Horse of the Year. His three-year-old campaign was cut short by injury but he was still Horse of the Year based on his three wins including the Belmont Stakes. As a sire, he suffered from fertility problems but still sired multiple stakes winners.

Colin was inducted into the National Museum of Racing and Hall of Fame in 1956. In the Blood-Horse magazine List of the Top 100 Racehorses of the 20th Century, he was ranked number 15.

Pedigree
Colin was a brown stallion with three white socks and a stripe and snip on his face. He was foaled in 1905 at Castleton Stud in Kentucky and was owned by London-born financier James R. Keene. Colin was from the third crop of foals by the stakes winner and leading sire Commando (by Domino), who had been bred by James Keene. Colin's dam was the English stakes-winning Pastorella (GB), by Springfield. She had been imported to the US by Marcus Daly and was purchased by Keene in 1901.

Racing career
Colin was trained by Hall of Fame inductee James G. Rowe, Sr. Rowe had handled many top horses in his long career, including Sysonby, Hindoo (who was never unplaced), and the first filly to win the Kentucky Derby, Regret. Rowe and his horses Miss Woodford, Luke Blackburn, Whisk Broom II, Commando, and Peter Pan were inducted into the Hall of Fame.

James Keene was not initially enthusiastic about Colin, noting his disfiguring curb, or thoroughpin, meaning that the colt had an enlarged hock.  He'd been just as disdainful of an earlier purchase: Colin's grandsire Domino, (another eventual Horse of the Year in 1893 and Hall of Famer), but his son, Foxwell Keene, bought Domino anyway.

A friend of Keene's, De Courcey Forbes, always named the Castleton foals.  Colin was for "Poor Colin", a pastoral poem by the English poet laureate Nicholas Rowe, thus connecting the name of Colin's dam and the name of his trainer, who took a keen interest in his horses. A hands-on trainer, Rowe was famous for the personal attention he paid to his horses.  He literally traveled in the same railroad car with them.  Aware that Colin's swollen hock would give him trouble, Rowe attended to it with massages and cold water baths.

Consistently rated as one of the best horses in American racing history, and a celebrity with both fans and horsemen, Colin started fifteen times in his two-year career and never lost.  Twelve of these races came when he was a two-year-old.  In an age that valued stamina and maturity, Colin was still viewed with awe by the horsemen of his time.   Sportswriter Abram Hewitt said, "The blood surges, and the pulses quicken at the very sight of such Olympians on the track."  Hewitt had "listened to old-time horsemen talk about Colin with an other-world expression on their faces."  Colin was voted the Eclipse Award for Horse of the Year twice: in 1907 and 1908.  He was also America's Champion Three-Year-Old Male in 1908.

Colin's last victory came on June 20, 1908 in the Tidal Stakes at Sheepshead Bay, after which he was sent to England to race, but was pulled up lame in a workout and was retired.

Stud record
Colin stood his first season in 1909 at Heath Stud, near Newmarket, England, for a fee of 98 guineas. He was neglected by the English breeders due to his American bloodlines.  First in England, and then back in Kentucky after Keene died, Colin was plagued by infertility problems. In c. 1913, Colin was purchased for $30,000 by Wickliffe Stud, where he stood until the stud was dispersed in January 1918. Edward B. McLean then purchased the 13-year-old Colin for $5,100 to stand at his Belray Farm, near Middleburg, Virginia. He sired 11 stakes winners out of 81 foals in 23 seasons at stud, which translates into 14% of his get.  His best galloper was Jock (1924 from Kathleen by *Sempronius; 17 wins and $95,255). His son Neddie was the paternal grandsire of Alsab. Another was On Watch, the broodmare sire Stymie.

Colin died in 1932 at the age of twenty-seven on Belray Farm near Middleburg, Virginia. His lifetime earnings amounted to $180,912.

Kent Hollingsworth admired Colin's career as a racehorse and observed the horses' potential in his book, The Great Ones. He said, "Great horses have been beaten by mischance, racing luck, injury and lesser horses running the race of their lives. None of these, however, took Colin. He was unbeatable."

Honors
Colin was inducted into the National Museum of Racing and Hall of Fame in 1956. In The Blood-Horse magazine ranking of the top 100 U.S. thoroughbred champions of the 20th Century, he was ranked #15.  It was eighty years before another horse, Personal Ensign, retired unbeaten in America.

Pedigree

See also
 List of leading Thoroughbred racehorses

References

 America's Champion Three-Year-Old Males
 Colin's Hall of Fame page
 James Rowe's Hall of Fame page, with photos

External links
 Colin Wins 1908 Belmont Stakes

1905 racehorse births
1932 racehorse deaths
Racehorses bred in Kentucky
Racehorses trained in the United States
Horse racing track record setters
American Champion racehorses
American Thoroughbred Horse of the Year
United States Thoroughbred Racing Hall of Fame inductees
Belmont Stakes winners
Undefeated racehorses
Thoroughbred family 19-b